Bradina intermedialis is a moth in the family Crambidae. It was described by Aristide Caradja in 1932. It is found on China.

References

Moths described in 1932
Bradina